China Tom Miéville  (born 6 September 1972) is a British speculative fiction writer and literary critic. He often describes his work as weird fiction and is allied to the loosely associated movement of writers called New Weird.

Miéville has won numerous awards for his fiction, including the Arthur C. Clarke Award, British Fantasy Award, BSFA Award, Hugo Award, Locus Award and World Fantasy Awards. He holds the record for the most Arthur C Clarke Award wins (three). His novel Perdido Street Station was ranked by Locus as the 6th all-time best fantasy novel published in the 20th century. During 2012–13, he was writer-in-residence at Roosevelt University in Chicago. He became a Fellow of the Royal Society of Literature in 2015.

Miéville is active in anti-capitalist politics in the United Kingdom and has previously been a member of the International Socialist Organization (US) and the short-lived International Socialist Network (UK). He was formerly a member of the Socialist Workers Party, and in 2013 became a founding member of Left Unity. He stood for Regent's Park and Kensington North for the Socialist Alliance in the 2001 United Kingdom general election, gaining 1.2% of votes cast. He published his PhD thesis on Marxism and international law as a book in 2005.

Early life and education
Miéville was born in Norwich and brought up in Willesden, and has lived in London since early childhood. He grew up with his sister Jemima and mother Claudia. His mother was a translator, writer and teacher, and the daughter of Leo Claude Vaux Miéville, whose wife Youla (née Harrison) was granddaughter of Edward Littleton, 4th Baron Hatherton.  His parents chose his first name, China, from a dictionary, looking for a beautiful name. By virtue of his mother's birth in New York City, Miéville holds dual American and British citizenship. In 1982 his mother married Paul Lightfoot, who also has aristocratic connections; they divorced in 1992.

Miéville boarded at Oakham School, a co-educational independent school in Oakham, Rutland, for two years. He subsequently attended University College School . At the age of eighteen, in 1990, he taught English for a year in Egypt, where he developed an interest in Arab culture and in Middle Eastern politics. Miéville studied for a BA degree in social anthropology at Clare College, Cambridge, graduating in 1994, and gained both a master's degree and PhD in international law from the London School of Economics in 2001. Miéville has also held a Frank Knox fellowship at Harvard University. After becoming dissatisfied with the ability of post-modern theories to explain history and political events, he became a Marxist at university. A book version of his PhD thesis, entitled Between Equal Rights: A Marxist Theory of International Law, was published in the UK in 2005 by Brill in their "Historical Materialism" series, and in the United States in 2006 by Haymarket Books.

Literary influences 
Miéville's works all describe fantastical or supernatural worlds or scenarios. Miéville has said he plans to write a novel in every genre. To this end, he has "constructed an oeuvre" that ranges from classic American Western (in Iron Council) to sea-quest (in The Scar and Railsea) to detective noir (in The City & the City). His work has been described as new weird fiction.

Miéville has listed M. John Harrison, Michael de Larrabeiti, Michael Moorcock, Thomas M. Disch, Charles Williams, Tim Powers, and J. G. Ballard as literary "heroes"; he has also frequently discussed as influences H. P. Lovecraft, Mervyn Peake, Ursula K. Le Guin, and Gene Wolfe. He has said that he would like his novels "to be read for [his imagined city] New Crobuzon as Iain Sinclair does for London".

Miéville played a great deal of Dungeons & Dragons and similar roleplaying games (RPGs) in his youth. He has attributed his tendency to systematisation of magic and theology to this influence. In his novel Perdido Street Station, he refers to characters interested "only in gold and experience". The February 2007 issue of Dragon magazine interpreted the world presented in his books according to Dungeons & Dragons rules. The Player's Handbook for the fifth edition of Dungeons & Dragons cited his novel Perdido Street Station as a source of inspiration for the game's designers.

In 2010, Miéville made his first foray into writing for RPGs with a contribution to the Pathfinder Roleplaying Game supplement Guide to the River Kingdoms.

Miéville once described Tolkien as "the wen on the arse of fantasy literature". Miéville is also indebted to Moorcock, having cited his essay "Epic Pooh" as the source upon which he is "riffing" or even simply "cheerleading" in his critique of Tolkien-imitative fantasy. Despite his criticisms, Miéville has praised Tolkien for his contributions to fantasy, especially in a 2009 blog post where he gave five reasons why Tolkien was praiseworthy.

He has cited Michael de Larrabeiti's Borrible Trilogy as one of his biggest influences, and he wrote an introduction for the trilogy's 2002 reissue (the introduction was eventually left out of the book, but appears on de Larrabeiti's website).

Politics 
Miéville has previously been a member of the International Socialist Organization (US) and, until 13 March 2013, was also a member of the Socialist Workers Party (SWP, UK). He stood unsuccessfully for the House of Commons of the United Kingdom in the 2001 general election as a candidate for the Socialist Alliance, gaining 459 votes, i.e. 1.2%, in Regent's Park and Kensington North, a Labour constituency.

In January 2013, he emerged as a critic of the SWP's leadership and in March resigned over the leadership's handling of rape allegations against an SWP member.

In August 2013, Miéville was one of nine signatories (along with veteran film-maker and socialist Ken Loach, academic Gilbert Achcar, General Secretary of the Campaign for Nuclear Disarmament Kate Hudson, fellow novelist Michael Rosen, and actor Roger Lloyd Pack) of an open letter to the Guardian newspaper announcing the foundation of a "new party of the left", to be called Left Unity. The letter, which claimed that Labour policies on austerity and the breaking of ties with trades unions amounted to a "final betrayal of the working-class people it was founded to represent", stated that Left Unity would be launched at a "founding conference" in London on 30 November 2013 and would provide, as an "alternative" to Labour, "a party that is socialist, environmentalist, feminist and opposed to all forms of discrimination". 

In 2014 – together with Richard Seymour, Rosie Warren, Jamie Allinson, Margaret Corvid, and others – Miéville quit the International Socialist Network, a Left Unity faction, over a dispute concerning the acceptability of sexual "race play" that was prompted by discussion of a controversial art piece owned by Dasha Zhukova.

In 2015, he was announced as one of the founding editors of a "bi-annual journal of revolutionary arts and letters", Salvage, with editor-in-chief Rosie Warren, editor Jamie Allinson, and contributing editors Richard Seymour, Margaret Corvid (as Magpie Corvid), and Charlotte Bence. He has been the director of Salvage Publications since 2014.

October, published in 2017, documents the dramatic events of the Russian revolution. Jonathan Steele reviewed it for The Guardian. Steele considers it an ideological though nuanced retelling: "Known as a left-wing activist, [...] Miéville writes with the brio and excitement of an enthusiast who would have wanted the revolution to succeed. But he is primarily interested in the dramatic narrative – the weird facts – of the most turbulent year in Russia's history".

Personal life 

In the early 2000s, Miéville lived in London with his partner Emma Bircham. They were both cast as extras in the 1999 film Notting Hill, which he humorously described as a dystopian alternate history of an ethnically cleansed city.

In 2013, Miéville denied allegations of emotional abuse made by an ex-girlfriend. He acknowledged having had a brief affair with the woman, but stated that her account of it was untrue. According to Miéville, he was in a non-monogamous relationship at the time, a fact of which she was aware.

Since 2018, he has taken steps to defend his privacy, following what he describes as a campaign of harassment and online defamation.

Bibliography 

A comprehensive list of Miéville's work is available at the ISFDB.

Fiction

Bas-Lag series 
 Perdido Street Station (2000)
 The Scar (2002)
 Iron Council (2004)

Stand-alone novels 
 King Rat (1998) 
 Un Lun Dun (2007) 
 The City & the City (2009) 
 Kraken (2010) 
 Embassytown (2011) 
 Railsea (2012)

Novellas 
 The Tain (2002)
 This Census-Taker (2016)
 The Last Days of New Paris (2016)

Short story collections 
 Looking for Jake (2005)
 The Apology Chapbook (2013)
 Three Moments of an Explosion: Stories (2015)

Children's picture books 
 The Worst Breakfast (2016), co-written and illustrated by Zak Smith

Comic books 
 Hellblazer (1988 series) – #250 "Holiday Special": "Snow Had Fallen" (feb. 2009)
 Justice League (2011 series) – #23.3 "Dial E #1: Dial Q for Qued" (nov. 2013)
 Dial H (2012–2013 series) – #1-#15

Other 
 Pathfinder Chronicles: Guide to the River Kingdoms (2010), with Elaine Cunningham, Chris Pramas, and Steve Kenson. Paizo Publishing.

In an anthology 
 "Watching God" (first publ. in Three Moments of an Explosion, 2015), in Out of the Ruins, edited by Preston Grassmann, Titan Books, 2021

Nonfiction

Books
 Between Equal Rights: A Marxist Theory of International Law (2005). Leiden: Brill. 
 Red Planets: Marxism and Science Fiction (2009), with Mark Bould. Middletown, Conn.: Wesleyan University Press.
 October: The Story of the Russian Revolution (2017). Verso.
 A Spectre, Haunting: On the Communist Manifesto (2022). Head of Zeus.

Essays
 "London's Overthrow" (2011). Reprinted in a shorter version as "Oh, London, You Drama Queen", The New York Times Magazine 2012-03-01: 42.
 "Preface to a Book not yet Written nor Disavowed" (2015). China Miéville: Critical Essays, eds. Caroline Edwards and Tony Venezia.

Adaptations
 In 2006 Miéville's short story "Details" (collected in Looking for Jake) was adapted as a screenplay by Dan Kay, and subsequently picked up by the studio Paramount Vantage.
 In February 2013, a stage adaptation of The City and the City, written by Christopher M. Walsh and directed by Dorothy Milne, made its world premiere at Lifeline Theatre in Chicago, Illinois. Miéville attended 16 March 2013 production of the adaptation.
 A television adaptation of the novel The City & the City was broadcast on BBC 2 in 2018.
 American artist Mariam Ghani's The City & The City (2015), is a loose adaptation of the novel The City & the City as a video artwork which "maps the conceptual framework of that novel onto the cityscape of St. Louis, melding some of the fictions of the novel’s world with elements drawn from past and present histories of the city."
 The short story "Estate" (collected in Three Moments of an Explosion: Stories ) was adapted into a 25-minute movie, released on August 14, 2020, that was described by a review in SciFiNow as "a 25 minute blast of striking imagery, earnest performances and intriguing themes."

Honours 

Miéville has won numerous accolades in speculative fiction; he holds the record for the most Arthur C Clarke Award wins (three). Perdido Street Station was featured in Locus poll of all-time best 20th century fantasy novels, where it ranked 6th place.

 Miéville's first novel, King Rat (1998), was nominated for both an International Horror Guild and a Bram Stoker award. 
 The Scar received a Philip K. Dick Award special citation. 
 "Reports of Certain Events in London" (featured in the anthology McSweeney's Enchanted Chamber of Astonishing Stories) was nominated for a 2005 World Fantasy Award and tied for the 2005 Locus Award for Best Novelette. 
 The City & the City won the 2009 Kitschies Award.
 Miéville has been a Guest of Honour at multiple science fiction conventions, including Orbital 2008 the British National Science Fiction convention (Eastercon) in London and Readercon 2006.
 He was a 2018 Guggenheim Fellow in Fiction.

References

Further reading

Books on China Miéville

Scholarly articles 
 
 
 
 
 
  Reviews Railsea.

External links

 "Rejectamentalist Manifesto" Blog by China Miéville
 
 
 
 "In a Carapace of Light: A Conversation with China Miéville" at Clarkesworld Magazine
 Perdido Street Station, The Scar and Iron Council (2004) all make Steampunkbooks.net's list of Top Ten Steampunk Books of All Time.

 Appearances
 Audio interview on his Book October with Novara Media

1972 births
20th-century English male writers
20th-century English novelists
21st-century British novelists
21st-century English male writers
Academics of the University of Warwick
Alumni of Clare College, Cambridge
Alumni of the London School of Economics
British atheists
British speculative fiction critics
Cthulhu Mythos writers
English atheists
English children's writers
English comics writers
English fantasy writers
English horror writers
English Marxist writers
English people of French descent
Fellows of the Royal Society of Literature
Hugo Award-winning writers
Living people
Marxist theorists
People educated at Oakham School
People educated at University College School
Postmodern writers
Science fiction critics
Socialist Workers Party (UK) members
Weird fiction writers
World Fantasy Award-winning writers
Writers from Norwich